Eugène Louis Lami (12 January 1800 – 19 December 1890) was a French painter, watercolorist, lithographer, illustrator and designer. He was a painter of fashionable Paris during the period of the July Monarchy and the Second French Empire and also made history paintings and illustrations for books such as Gil Blas and Manon Lescaut.

Life
He worked at the studio of Horace Vernet then studied at the École des Beaux-Arts in Paris with Camille Roqueplan and Paul Delaroche under Antoine-Jean Gros. While there, he learned watercolor technique from Richard Parkes Bonington and later became a founding member of the Society of French Watercolorists.

Lami began working in lithography and in 1819 produced a set of 40 lithographs depicting the Spanish cavalry. These, plus a collaboration with Vernet on a large set of lithographs titled Collections des uniformes des armées françaises de 1791 à 1814  helped build a reputation for doing military scenes which transferred to his paintings. His 1829 portrait of the English king, Charles I of England as he was being led to imprisonment in Carisbrooke Castle was purchased by King Louis-Philippe of France and was on display in the French National Assembly from 1848 to 1969.

Today, this work along with his 1840 painting of Louise Marie Adélaïde de Bourbon-Penthièvre, duchesse d'Orléans in the gardens of the Tuileries Palace are both in the Louvre. Lami's painting of the Battle of New Orleans, depicting the moment of the American victory over the British on 26 January 1815 is in the Louisiana State Museum at The Cabildo in New Orleans. He also painted a scene of the storming of Redoubt #10 during the Siege of Yorktown.

Gallery

References

19th Century Watercolors by Christopher Finch (1991) Abbeville Publishing Group (Abbeville Press, Inc.)

External links

Prints & People: A Social History of Printed Pictures, an exhibition catalog from The Metropolitan Museum of Art (fully available online as PDF), which contains material on Lami (see index)

1800 births
1890 deaths
19th-century French painters
French male painters
French lithographers
Pupils of Antoine-Jean Gros
19th-century French male artists